Khekra (also spelled as Khekada) is an NCR City and sub-district headquarters of Baghpat district in the Indian state of Uttar Pradesh.

Demographics
At the 2001 Census of India, Khekada had a population of nearly 40,000. Males constituted 54% of the population and females 46%. Khekada had an average literacy rate of 62%, higher than the national average of 59.5%: male literacy was 70% and female literacy was 52%. In Khekada, 16% of the population were under 6 years of age.

References

Cities and towns in Bagpat district